Chosen Lords is a compilation album by Richard D. James, released under the aliases AFX and Aphex Twin. It is a CD compilation of selected tracks previously released on the vinyl-only Analord series. Limited edition copies distributed with a poster were offered on Warpmart to encourage pre-ordering.

Eight of the 10 tracks are under the "AFX" moniker, while "Fenix Funk 5" and "XMD 5a" are under the Aphex Twin alias.

Chosen Lords reached #82 on the UK Albums Chart.

Reception
Initial critical response to Chosen Lords was positive. At Metacritic, which assigns a normalized rating out of 100 to reviews from mainstream critics, the album has received an average score of 81, indicating "universal acclaim", based on 19 reviews.

Track listing

References

External links

Rephlex records
Warp Records page on Chosen Lords

Acid techno albums
Aphex Twin compilation albums
2006 compilation albums
Rephlex Records compilation albums